Eugene Matthew Ford (June 23, 1912 – September 7, 1970) was a professional baseball pitcher who played in Major League Baseball (MLB) for the Boston Bees during 1936 and the Chicago White Sox during 1938.

Biography
Born in Fort Dodge, Iowa, Ford attended the University of Iowa, where he pitched for the Hawkeyes baseball team, and was captain of the 1935 varsity. Following his graduation, he pitched in Minor League Baseball with the Peoria Tractors in 1935 and Columbia Senators in 1936, both Class B teams. 

Ford made a single major-league appearance for the 1936 Boston Bees, pitching two innings in relief on June 17 against the St. Louis Cardinals; he allowed one run on two hits. Ford then missed the 1937 season, due to injury sustained when he fell from bleachers at his alma mater. He finished his professional career with four relief appearances for the 1938 Chicago White Sox, allowing 16 runs in 14 innings. Overall for his limited major-league career, Ford pitched in five games, all in relief, and compiled a 9.56 earned run average (ERA) while striking out two batters and walking 12 batters in 16 innings pitched. As a batter, he registered one hit in six at bats, and as a fielder he did not commit an error in five total chances.

After his baseball career, Ford was a farmer in Emmetsburg, Iowa. He served as secretary of the Iowa Farmers' Union and was active in the Democratic Party. He died in 1970 in Emmetsburg from a heart attack at age 58; he was survived by four siblings.

See also
 Bill Ford (pitcher), whose lone MLB appearance was incorrectly attributed to Gene Ford until 2003

References

External links

1912 births
1970 deaths
Sportspeople from Fort Dodge, Iowa
Baseball players from Iowa
Iowa Hawkeyes baseball players
Major League Baseball pitchers
Boston Bees players
Chicago White Sox players
Columbia Senators players
Peoria Tractors players